XHMZA-FM/XEMZA-AM is a radio station on 89.7 FM and 560 AM in Cihuatlán, Jalisco, serving the Manzanillo, Colima area. The station is owned by Grupo Radiofónico ZER and broadcasts a romantic music format known as Sol FM.

History
XHMZA began as XEGUZ-AM in Ciudad Guzmán, Jalisco, broadcasting on 550 kHz as a 200-watt daytimer. Jorge Valdovinos López received the concession for XEMZA in September 1979. The station was sold to XEGUZ, S.A. de C.V. in 1987; the callsign was changed to XEMZA around that time period.

By the early 2000s, XEMZA had moved to 560 kHz and to Cihuatlán, where its power increased to 10 kW day/1 kW night. It was now clearly targeting Manzanillo.

In 2011, it received authorization to move to FM as XHMZA-FM 89.7, but it was required to maintain its AM station, as communities could lose radio service were the AM station to go off the air, and in 2015 it received permission to install an emergency transmitter located in Manzanillo proper. The FM transmitter later moved across the state line to Cerro del Toro as part of a class upgrade.

In October 2022, the Federal Telecommunications Institute (IFT) approved XHMZA-FM to change frequencies from 89.7 to 100.1 MHz. The change is intended to resolve an interference issue caused by intermodulation of XHMZA-FM and Manzanillo's XHMAC-FM 95.3 to frequencies in the 162 MHz range used by the Comisión Federal de Electricidad.

References

Radio stations in Jalisco
Radio stations in Mexico with continuity obligations